Tervo is a municipality of Finland. It is located in the province of Eastern Finland and is part of the Northern Savonia region.

Neighbouring municipalities are Keitele, Kuopio, Maaninka, Pielavesi, Rautalampi, Suonenjoki, and Vesanto. 30% of its area is covered by water. Summer cottages are as prevalent as households. The municipality is unilingually Finnish.

Marko Hietala, the bass player for Nightwish, is from Tervo.

References

External links

Municipality of Tervo – Official website

 
Populated places established in 1926